Anbarlu may refer to:
 Anbarlu, Ardabil
 Anbarlu, East Azerbaijan